The 1969 German Open Championships was a combined men's and women's tennis tournament played on outdoor red clay courts. It was the 61st edition of the tournament, the second one in the Open Era, and the first edition to offer official prize money. The event took place at the Am Rothenbaum in Hamburg, West Germany, from 5 August through 11 August 1969. First-seeded Tony Roche and Judy Tegart won the singles titles. Tegart also won the doubles (with Helga Niessen) and mixed doubles (with Marty Riessen) titles.

Finals

Men's singles
 Tony Roche defeated  Tom Okker 6–1, 5–7, 7–5, 8–6

Women's singles
 Judy Tegart defeated  Helga Niessen 6–3, 6–4

Men's doubles
 Tom Okker /  Marty Riessen defeated  Jean-Claude Barclay /  Jürgen Fassbender 6–1, 6–2, 6–4

Women's doubles
 Judy Tegart /  Helga Niessen defeated  Edda Buding /  Helga Hösl Schultze 6–1, 6–4

Mixed doubles
 Judy Tegart /  Marty Riessen defeated  Pat Walkden /  Frew McMillan 6–4, 6–1

References

External links
  
   
 Association of Tennis Professionals (ATP) tournament profile
 International Tennis Federation (ITF) tournament edition details

Hamburg European Open
German Open Championships
1969 in West German sport
1969 in German tennis